Fort Custer State Recreation Area is a  State Recreation Area located between Battle Creek and Kalamazoo, Michigan. The area features lakes, the Kalamazoo River, over 25 miles of multi-use trails, second growth oak barrens and dry-mesic southern (oak-hickory) forests.

History
The land was acquired in 1917 by the Federal Government and used as an induction and military training center for the US Army. Despite the history of military use that has taken place on and around the property, there was never a fort on the land. During World War II, the property was named Camp Custer.  The Michigan Department of Natural Resources (DNR) acquired the land in 1971 as part of the Nixon administration's Legacy of Parks program. Today, the Fort Custer Training Center of the Michigan National Guard borders the recreation area.

In 1974, several ditches were modified and naturalized into creeks by the H. W. Kacey Company.  The longest of these, which today is a naturally flowing stream, was named "Kacey's Creek," though that information has since been left off maps.

The trails were designed beginning in 1993 and were used for hiking, mountain biking, and horseback riding until trails were separated in November 2011.  Over 15 miles of equestrian trails were added as well as a separate parking area.

Facilities and activities
Fort Custer is a popular destination for hunting, mountain biking, camping, horseback riding, hiking, fishing, and dog mushing. The park has developed a set of trails covering the majority of the area, designed for mountain biking / hiking and a separate trail system for horseback riding. They surround each of the lakes: Eagle, Whitford, Lawler and Jackson. The trails also connect to a camping area adjacent to Jackson Hole. In October 2008, a disc golf course in the Eagle Lake area was completed (it is no longer there). Fort Custer Recreation Area has a campground with 219 lots. There is a camp office and small store. Firewood, ice, and some other convenience items can be purchased.   Two of those lots are mini cabins. The lots vary in size, some big enough for a tent, picnic table and fire ring, while some lots can accommodate up to a 50-foot RV.

The Fort Custer mountain bike trails are divided into two levels of difficulty: blue being easy, green and red being difficult.

There is cross-country skiing in the winter. Mini cabins and rustic cabins are available for rent, one rustic cabin fronting the Kalamazoo River.

Fishing
There are three easily accessible lakes: Eagle Lake, Jackson Lake and Whitford-Lawler Lake. The Kalamazoo River also runs along the western of the park. Several types of panfish found within the area including bluegill (Lepomis macrochirus), pumpkinseed (Lepomis gibbosus), redbreast sunfish (Lepomis auritus) and yellow perch (Perca flavescens). There are a few species that are sought after as sport fish such as the largemouth bass (Micropterus salmoides) and smallmouth bass (Micropterus dolomieu). There are also abundant common carp (Cyprinus carpio) in Eagle Lake and the Kalamazoo River. During the winter ice fishers can often be seen on all three lakes.

Wildlife
Because of the large amount of land and restoration projects in place at Fort Custer, there are countless species of plants and animals. Abundant water sources make Fort Custer a safe haven for many types waterfowl. Not only has the land become a safe haven for the waterfowl but a safe haven for other threatened, near threatened and least-concern species of the area.

Birds
 American bittern,  Botaurus lentiginosus
 Trumpeter swan.  Cygnus buccinator
 Cooper's hawk,  Accipiter cooperii
 Common moorhen,  Gallinula chloropus
 Cerulean warbler,  Dendroica cerulea
 Prothonotary warbler,  Protonotaria citrea
 Louisiana waterthrush,  Seiurus motacilla
 Hooded warbler,  Wilsonia citrina
 Grasshopper sparrow,  Ammodramus savannarum
 Henslow's sparrow,  Ammodramus henslowii
 Wild turkey, Meleagris gallopavo

Reptiles
 Eastern box turtle, Terrapene carolina carolina
Amphibians
 Blanchard's cricket frog, Acris crepitans blanchardi
Plants
 Leadplant, Amorpha canescens
 White false indigo, Baptisia alba
 Yellow harlequin, Corydalis flavula
 Downy sunflower, Helianthus mollis
 False boneset, Kuhnia eupatorioides

Invasive species
There are also several types of invasive species that can be found throughout the area. Because of the current issues with the emerald ash borer (Agrilus planipennis), visitors are not allowed to move fire wood in or out of the park. Visitors are also prohibited from bring in any fish from other waters due to the growing common carp (Cyprinus carpio) problems; often these carp come from the Kalamazoo River which runs along the western border of the park. Other known invasive species include garlic mustard (Alliaria petiolata) and purple loosestrife (Lythrum salicaria); these species are being dealt with by using controlled fires.

Getting there
Fort Custer State Recreation Area is located north of Interstate 94 between Battle Creek and Kalamazoo, Michigan at exits 85 or 92. The park is just east of Augusta on M-96.

See also
Fort Custer Training Center

References

External links

 Fort Custer Recreation Area Michigan Department of Natural Resources
 Fort Custer Michigan Mountain Bike Association (MMBA)
 Fort Custer Mountain Bike Trail Map
 Fort Custer Recreation Area Protected Planet (World Database on Protected Areas)

State recreation areas of Michigan
Protected areas of Calhoun County, Michigan
Protected areas of Kalamazoo County, Michigan
Important Bird Areas of Michigan
Mountain biking venues in the United States
Tourist attractions in Calhoun County, Michigan
Tourist attractions in Kalamazoo County, Michigan
Protected areas established in 1971
1971 establishments in Michigan